Ren Rongrong (任溶溶; 19 May 1923 – 22 September 2022) was a Chinese writer and translator of Russian, English, Italian and Japanese children's literature.

Life 
Ren was born in 1923 in Heshan, Guangdong Province. After graduating from the Department of Chinese Literature at the Great China University in 1945, he  served as Vice Director of the editorial department of Juvenile and Children's Publishing House and Deputy Editor-in-Chief of Shanghai Translation Publishing House.

Honours and awards 
 Chen Bochui Children's Literature Award
 Soong Chingling Children's Literature Award
 Soong Ching-ling Camphor Tree Award
 Asian Children's Book Award
 2013 Shanghai Life Award in Literature and Art
 2012 "Lifetime Achievement Award in Translation" from the Translators Association of China
 2006 IBBY Honor Award for his translation of Charlie and the Chocolate Factory
 2002 "Senior Translator" award of the Translators Association of China

Translations 
Ren's translations include 
 The Complete Andersen's Fairy Tales
 Pushkin's Fairy Tales
 Pinocchio
 Pippi Longstocking
 The Wind in the Willows
 The Twelve Months
 Russian Folk Tales

References

Sources 
 China.org.cn Wiki

External links 
 Ren Rongrong on Worldcat

1923 births
2022 deaths
People's Republic of China translators
English–Chinese translators
Russian–Chinese translators
Italian-Chinese translators
Japanese–Chinese translators
Translators to Chinese
Members of the 7th Chinese People's Political Consultative Conference
People from Heshan